Thomas or Tom May may refer to:

Politicians
Thomas May (Royalist) (1604–1655), MP for Midhurst, 1640–1642
Sir Thomas May (MP for Chichester) (c.1645–1718), MP for Chichester 1689–1701
Thomas May (MP for Canterbury) (c. 1701–1781), MP for Canterbury, 1734–1741

Sports
Thomas May (cricketer), English cricketer in the 1760s and 1770s
Tom May (rugby union) (born 1979), rugby union player

Others
Tom May (mycologist), mycologist
Thomas May (1595–1650), English poet and dramatist
Thomas Erskine May (1815–1886), English political scientist